The 2010–11 winter transfer window for English football transfers opened on 1 January and closed at 23:00 on 31 January 2011. Additionally, players without a club may join at any time, clubs below Premier League level may sign players on loan at any time, and clubs may sign a goalkeeper on an emergency loan if they have no registered goalkeeper available. This list includes transfers featuring at least one Premier League or Football League Championship club which were completed after the end of the summer 2010 transfer window and before the end of the 2010–11 winter window.

Transfers

Notes and references
General

Specific

Transfers Winter 2010-11
Winter 2010-11
English